1914 was the 25th season of County Championship cricket in England. It was terminated at the end of August following the outbreak of the First World War. The last four matches to be played all finished on 2 September and the remaining five scheduled fixtures were cancelled.

Honours
County Championship - Surrey
Minor Counties Championship - not determined
Wisden - Johnny Douglas, Percy Fender, Wally Hardinge, Donald Knight, Sydney Smith

County Championship

Leading batsmen 
J W Hearne topped the averages with 2116 runs @ 60.45

Leading bowlers 
Colin Blythe topped the averages with 170 wickets @ 15.19

Annual reviews
 Wisden Cricketers' Almanack 1915

See also
 Cricket in the Great War

External links
 CricketArchive – season summaries

1914 in English cricket
English cricket seasons in the 20th century